The Hearth Turned Off (Italian:Il focolare spento) is a 1925 Italian silent film directed by Augusto Genina and starring Carmen Boni.

Cast
 Jeanne Brindeau as The mother  
 Ubaldo Cocchi as The Father  
 Arnold Kent as François Gaspari - the son  
 Carmen Boni as Marie  
 Carlo Tedeschi as Professor Antonio Mazzara  
 Rina De Liguoro as Manoela  
 Dolly Grey 
 Marcella Sabbatini 
 Giorgio Bianchini

References

Bibliography
 Stewart, John. Italian film: a who's who. McFarland, 1994.

External links

1925 films
1920s Italian-language films
Films based on works by Edmondo De Amicis
Films directed by Augusto Genina
Italian silent feature films
Italian black-and-white films